Joseph Kaiser (born October 14, 1977 in Montreal) is a Canadian operatic tenor and theatre actor, known for appearing in Kenneth Branagh's English-language film version of The Magic Flute.

Career 
In 2005, Kaiser won second prize in Plácido Domingo's Operalia International Opera Competition while competing as a baritone. The judges were keen to his talents and potential as a tenor, and proposed that he make the switch to tenor. He has performed as a soloist with the New York Metropolitan Opera, making his debut in October 2007 as Roméo in Gounod's Roméo et Juliette. In November, he returned to the Met to sing the role of Tamino in Mozart's Die Zauberflöte.

In 2006, he played the role of Tamino in Kenneth Branagh's English-language film version of The Magic Flute. The film has been released in Europe, but not in the U.S.

Kaiser was also an anthem singer at the Bell Centre in Montreal, Quebec and Madison Square Garden in New York.

On 4 September 2019, he withdrew from upcoming performances and announced "an indefinite leave of absence" from his singing career.

Filmography

Film

Television

References

1977 births
Living people
Singers from Montreal
Canadian operatic tenors
Kent School alumni
Operalia, The World Opera Competition prize-winners
21st-century Canadian male opera singers